Berthierville(also called Berthier-en-haut, and legally called Berthier before 1942) is a town located between Montreal and Trois-Rivières on the north shore of the Saint Lawrence River in Quebec, Canada. Berthierville is the seat of D'Autray Regional County Municipality, and is served by Autoroute 40, and is the junction of Routes 138 and 158. It is surrounded by the parish municipality of Sainte-Geneviève-de-Berthier.

The Marie Reine du Canada Pilgrimage column stops at the church of Sainte-Geneviève de Berthierville for Mass on the first day of its three-day walk from Lanoraie to Cap-de-la-Madeleine.

Demographics 

Population trend:
 Population in 2011: 4091 (2006 to 2011 population change: 2.1%)
 Population in 2006: 4007
 Population in 2001: 3939
 Population in 1996: 3952
 Population in 1991: 3854

Mother tongue:
 English as first language: 0.3%
 French as first language: 96.5%
 English and French as first language: 0.3%
 Other as first language: 3.0%

Education

Centre de services scolaire des Samares, formerly the Commission scolaire des Samares, operates francophone public schools, including:
 École secondaire Pierre-de-Lestage
 École du Chemin-du-Roy
 pavillon maternelle Sainte-Geneviève
 pavillon Sainte-Geneviève
 pavillon Saint-Joseph
 École de l'Île Saint-Ignace (currently in Berthierville)

The Sir Wilfrid Laurier School Board operates anglophone public schools, including:
 Joliette Elementary School in Saint-Charles-Borromée
 Joliette High School in Joliette

Notable people
 Alexis St. Martin, Gastrointestinal experimentation pioneer
 Gilles Villeneuve, Formula One race car driver
 Jacques Villeneuve (racing driver, born 1953)
 Aristide Blais, Canadian Senator for Alberta
 Richard Landry, architect

See also
List of cities in Quebec

References

External links

Ville de Berthierville :: MRC de D'autray, Lanaudière

Cities and towns in Quebec
Incorporated places in Lanaudière